Vladimir Dubossarsky (1964) is a Russian painter working in pop art genre.

Since 1994 he performs in an art duet with Alexander Vinogradov. Both live and work in Moscow, Russia.  In the early part of their career together they adopted the style of socialist realism, an officially sanctioned art practice under the soviet regime.  Their early works resembled posters for non-existent thrillers and sleazy porn flicks.  They worked with their idea of social order, laborers, collective farmers, etc. and put a modern twist on an outdated practice.  Their result was a collection of ideas and themes that would make socialistic fantasies visible to the viewer.

In 2001, Dubosarsky and Vinogradov made a transition from the socialist fantasy to the ideals of mass media.  Total Painting (2001) created a large scale image of mass culture from around the world borrowing ideas from advertising and mainstream media.  Our Best World (2003) created a common ground for stars such as Sylvester Stallone, Spider-Man, Barbie, Madonna, Arnold Schwarzenegger, Marilyn Monroe, and even Picasso.  The Underwater World (2002) was made for the Russian pavilion for the 50th Venice Biennale. The piece references ideas gathered from pop images such as mail order catalogs, and heroes in contemporary advertising.

Solo exhibitions

2016
Sweeter than sugar, Louise Alexander Gallery, Porto Cervo, Italy 
FB shows and tells, Moscow Manege, Russia

2008
The New People Are Already Here. Deitch Projects, New York, USA
Meander. Resort Pirogovo, Moscow Region, Russia
Untitled. Vilma Gold Gallery, London, UK

2007
In the Artist's Studio. Gallery Orel Art, Paris, France
The Russian Painting Seasons. The State Tretyakov Gallery, Moscow, Russia

2006
Anthills. XL Gallery. Moscow, Russia
The Lightness of Being.  Resort Pirogovo, Moscow Region, Russia
Underwater Barber. Paperworks Gallery, Moscow, Russia

2005
Untitled. Charlotte Moser Gallery, Geneva, Switzerland
New Painting. XL Gallery, Moscow, Russia
9 Nudes Series. Gallery Orel Art, Paris, France
Graphic Works of Different Years. Paperworks Gallery, Moscow, Russia

2004
Aquafitness. Vilma Gold Gallery, London, UK

2003
Our Best World. Deitch Projects, New York, USA
Astrakhan Blues. XL Gallery, Moscow, Russia
Raining. Gallery Krinzinger, Viennа, Austria
Underwater Forever. Gallery Orel Art, Paris, France

2002
Total Painting. XL Gallery, Moscow, Russia
Painting for Finland. MUU Gallery, Helsinki, Finland
Untitled. Vilma Gold Gallery, London, UK

2001
How Are You, Ladies and Gentlemen? Gallery Claudio Poleschi, Lucca, Italy
Picture for London. Vilma Gold Gallery, London, UK
Sweet Girls. Moscow Fine Art Gallery, Moscow, Russia

2000
Inspiration. XL Gallery, Moscow, Russia
Flying Crans. Moscow Fine Art Gallery, Moscow, Russia

1999
Christ in Moscow. XL Gallery, Moscow, Russia
Just Pictures. Moscow Fine Art Gallery, Moscow, Russia

1998
P.S. Guelman Gallery, Moscow, Russia

1997
Erntedankfest. Atelier-Ester Freund, Vienna, Austria
Austrian and Russian Literature. Brasilica, Viennа, Austria
Etudes. L-Gallery, Moscow, Russia

1996
Russian Literature. Guelman Gallery, Moscow, Russia
Triumph. Guelman Gallery, Moscow, Russia
Bluhende Landschaften. Gallery Kai Higelman, Berlin, Germany
Project for Russian Playboy. Moscow Fine Art Gallery, Moscow, Russia

1995
A Picture for the Reichstag. Gallery Kai Hilgemann, Berlin, Germany
Paintings Made to Order. L- Gallery, Moscow, Russia

1994
Picasso in Moscow. Studio 20 Gallery, Moscow, Russia

Group exhibitions

2008
Thaw, Russian Art from Glasnost to the Present, Chelsea Art Museum, New York, USA
Exhibition of the Musée National de l'Art Moderne du Centre Pompidou, Seoul Museum of Art, Seoul, Korea
Russian Dreams. Art Basel Miami Beach, Miami, USA
ART-index. The Latvian National Museum of Art, Arsenal, Riga, Latvia

2007
I Believe. Winzavod, Moscow, Russia
New Exposition. The State Tretyakov Gallery, Moscow, Russia
Sots Art, Political Art in Russia from 1972 to Today. The State Tretyakov Gallery, Moscow, Russia; La Maison Rouge, Paris, France

2006
Russia! Solomon R. Guggenheim Museum, Bilbao, Spain

2005
StarZ. Museum of Modern Art, Moscow, Russia
Angels of History. MUHKA, Antwerpen, Belgium
Russian Pop Art. The State Tretyakov Gallery, Moscow, Russia
Russia! Solomon R. Guggenheim Museum, New York, USA

2004
Berlin-Moscow, 1950-2000. Martin  Gropius Bau, Berlin, Germany; The State Historical museum, Moscow, Russia
OOopsa! Contemporary Russian Art. National Museum of Contemporary Art, Oslo, Norway
Expander. Royal Academy of Arts, London, UK

2003
Returning of the Artist. 50th Venice Biennale, Russian pavilion, Venice, Italy
Moscow - Berlin, Berlin – Moscow. Berliner Gropius-Bau, Berlin, Germany

2002
Urgent Painting. Musee d'Art Modern de la Ville de Paris, Paris, France
Davai - Russian Art Now. Aus dem Laboratorium der Freien Kunste in Russland, Berlin, Germany; MAK, Vienna, Austria
São Paulo Biennale. São Paulo, Brazil

2001
Made in Italy. Palazzo della Triennale, Milan, Italy
Russian Madness. Biennale Valencia, Spain
Players. Watermill Center of Robert Wilson, New York, USA
Russian Artists in Vienna. Schloss Grafenegg, Vienna, Austria
Escape, 2nd Tirana Biennale, Albania

2000
I Hate You in June. Museum of Art Ein Harod, Israel
In & Out. 1st Tirana Biennale, Albania
Guelman's Collection. State Russian Museum, St Petersburg
Fuori Uso 2000. The Bridges. Pescara, Italy

1997
3rd Biennial of Contemporary Art. Cetine, Monte Negro
It's a Better World. Secession, Vienna, Austria

1995
Kunst im Verborgenen. Nonkonformisten Russland 1957-1995. Wilhelm-Hack Museum, Ludwigshaven; Documenta, Kassel; Staatliches Lindenau Museum, Altenburg, Germany
Zeigenössische Kunst aus Russland. Daimler-Benz Aerospace, München, Germany
INTERREGNUM. Kunsthalle Nurnberg,  Nurnberg, Germany

1994
Fluchtpunkt Moskau", Forum Ludwig, Aachen, Germany
2nd Biennial of Contemporary Art. Cetine, Monte Negro

Selected Collections
Art4.ru Contemporary Art Museum, Moscow, Russia
Bonn Historical Museum, Bonn, Germany
Centre Pompidou, Paris, France
Cultural Foundation “EKATERINA”, Moscow, Russia
Cultural Foundation “New”, Moscow, Russia
Duke University Museum of Art, Durham, USA
Houston Museum of Contemporary Art, Houston, USA
Ivanovo Museum, Ivanovo, Russia
MACI Museo Arte Contemporanea Isernia, Italy
Moscow House of Photography, Moscow, Russia
Museum Of Contemporary Art, Avignon, France
Museum of Contemporary Art of Valencia, Spain
New Rules Foundation, Moscow, Russia
Scheringa Museum voor Realisme, Spanbroek, Netherlands
Secession, Vienna, Austria
Yaroslavl Museum, Yaroslavl, Russia

External references
 Dubossarsky's biography
 Vladimir Dubossarsky "Sweeter than sugar" at Louise Alexander Gallery
 http://www.galerie-krinzinger.at/kuenstler/dubvino/dubvino_bi_fr.html

References

Russian painters
Russian male painters
Modern artists
1964 births
Living people
Russian contemporary artists